Tal-Kuskarovo (Tal Qusqarı) is a rural locality (a village) in Gusevsky Selsoviet, Abzelilovsky District, Bashkortostan, Russia. The population was 464 as of 2010. There are 9 streets.

Geography 
Tal-Kuskarovo is located 15 km southwest of Askarovo (the district's administrative centre) by road. Yarlykapovo is the nearest rural locality.

References 

Rural localities in Abzelilovsky District